Lachnodactyla is a genus of toe-winged beetles in the family Ptilodactylidae. There are at least two described species in Lachnodactyla.

Species
These two species belong to the genus Lachnodactyla:
 Lachnodactyla arizonica Schaeffer, 1906
 Lachnodactyla texana Schaeffer, 1906

References

Further reading

 

Byrrhoidea
Articles created by Qbugbot